Miltiadis Evert (12 May 1939 – 9 February 2011) was a Greek politician, a member of Parliament, government minister, and ex-chairman of the New Democracy party.

Origins
Evert was born in Athens, Greece. He was the son of Angelos Evert, chief of police in Athens during the Nazi occupation of Greece in World War II and credited for saving many Jews and resistance fighters from Gestapo persecution. The Ebert family is of Bavarian origin, one of the families that settled in Athens during the reign of King Otto in the early 19th century.

Early life
Evert studied at the Athens University of Economics and Business.

Political career
Evert served as the Mayor of Athens from 1 January 1987 to 14 May 1989, and he was chairman of New Democracy from 1993 to 1997. He also served many times as minister.

As mayor of Athens in 1987, Evert was the first to exercise the legal possibility of opposition radio broadcasting in Greece since all radio stations (including television networks) were a state monopoly. He helped launch Athena 98.4 FM, the first private radio station to begin broadcasting legally in Greece.

Personal life
He was married to photographer Lisa Vanderpool, daughter of American archaeologist Eugene Vanderpool, and they had two daughters.

On 9 February 2011 Evert died in Athens at the age of 71.

References

External links
Biography on Greek Parliament website

 

1939 births
2011 deaths
Mayors of Athens
New Democracy (Greece) politicians
Greek MPs 1974–1977
Greek MPs 1977–1981
Greek MPs 1981–1985
Greek MPs 1985–1989
Greek MPs 1989 (June–November)
Greek MPs 1989–1990
Greek MPs 1990–1993
Greek MPs 1993–1996
Greek MPs 1996–2000
Greek MPs 2000–2004
Greek MPs 2004–2007
Greek MPs 2007–2009
Greek people of Bavarian descent
Politicians from Athens
Athens University of Economics and Business alumni
Finance ministers of Greece
Leaders of New Democracy (Greece)